In the 1984–86 season, manager Osvaldo Bagnoli guided Hellas Verona F.C. to its only Serie A championship, shocking the Italian football public.

Season 
Hellas Verona added to its lineup Briegel (fullback), Preben Elkjær (centre forward), Fanna (winger), Di Gennaro (midfielder) and Galderisi (striker). Bagnoli's side had a good first half of league, losing only a game: it was on Avellino's pitch, where - in the last few minutes - Hellas gave up a 2–1 knockout.

In retour matches, the team achieved its best results in key games. This path - unexpected by most part of its supporters - came to climax on 12 May 1985, the Sunday on which, by drawing at Atalanta's home, Verona clinched its first domestic title.

Squad

Goalkeepers
  Claudio Garella
  Sergio Spuri

Defenders
  Hans-Peter Briegel
  Mauro Ferroni
  Silvano Fontolan
  Fabio Marangon
  Luciano Marangon
  Roberto Tricella

Midfielders
  Luciano Bruni
  Antonio Di Gennaro
  Dario Donà
  Pietro Fanna
  Luigi Sacchetti
  Domenico Volpati

Attackers
  Preben Elkjær
  Giuseppe Galderisi
  Franco Turchetta

Transfers

Competitions

Serie A

League table

Matches

Coppa Italia

First round

Eightfinals

Quarterfinals

References

Sources
 RSSSF - Italy 1984/85
 HellaStory.net

See also
 Hellas Verona F.C.

Hellas Verona F.C. seasons
Verona
1985